Thoda Hai Bas Thode Ki Zaroorat Hai (English: There Is A Little There Is A Need Of A Little More) is an Indian television series that aired on Colors TV.

Plot
It is the story of the Kulkarni's, a middle class Maharashtrian family living in Shivaji Park, Mumbai. The story is through the eyes of Mughdha who believes in high thinking but a modest small living. Thoda Hai Bas Thode Ki Zaroorat Hai portrays the struggle of this middle-class family as they face a materialistic world and constant clashes between old age ideologies and modern thinking.

Cast
 Arti Singh as Mugdha Shreekant Kulkarni
 Romit Raaj as Nishikant Kulkarni
 Sonali Nikam as Devki Nishikant Kulkarni
 Priyamvada Kant as Pragya Nishikant Kulkarni (Nishikant's ex-wife)
 Sachin Shroff as Shreekant Kulkarni
 Pradeep Shembekar as Umakant Kulkarni (Kaka)
 Asawari Joshi as Prabha Umakant Kulkarni (Kaki)
 Akanksha Juneja as Akshata Kulkarni 
 Neena Kulkarni as Sulekha Kulkarni
 Yasir Shah as Sambhav (Akshata's boyfriend)
 Shreya Bugade as Sangana
 Aarav Singh as Giriraj (Sangana's husband)

Colors TV original programming
Indian drama television series
2010 Indian television series debuts
2010 Indian television series endings